The Brockport Central School District is a public school district in New York State that, as of the 2021–22 school year, serves 3,069 students in grades pre-kindergarten through twelve in the village of Brockport and portions of the towns of Clarkson, Hamlin, Ogden, Parma and Sweden in Monroe County, a small portion of the town of Clarendon in Orleans County, and a small portion of the town of Bergen in Genesee County, with over 800 employees and an operating budget of $62 million (~$14,351 per student).

Class sizes average between 19 and 26 students and the student-teacher ratio is 15:1 (elementary), 13:1 (middle-high school).

The district is one of the oldest centralized districts in New York State.

Administrators
Sean Bruno - Superintendent of Schools
Jerilee Gulino - Assistant Superintendent for Human Resources
Darrin Winkley - Assistant Superintendent for Business
Lynn Carragher - Assistant to the Superintendent for Inclusive Education and Instruction
Dr. Rachel Kluth, Ed.D. - Assistant to the Superintendent for Instruction
Jill Reichhart - Director of Finance/Treasurer

Board of education
The Board of Education has seven members, who serve rotating five-year terms. Each May, school district voters go to the polls to vote for board members and the school district budget.

Current board members
Terry Ann Carbone - President (Term ends: 2024)
Jeffrey Harradine - Vice President (Term ends: 2027)
David Howlett (Term ends: 2025)
Daniel Legault (Term ends: 2026)
Robert Lewis (Term ends: 2023)
Kathleen Robertson (Term ends: 2024)
Michael Turbeville (Term ends: 2023)

Schools
The district operates five schools, each of which is dedicated to a specific grade range.

Elementary schools
Ginther Elementary School (Pre-K - 1), Principal – Randall Yu, Assistant Principal - Kelly Keenan
Barclay Elementary School (2-3), Principal – Scott Morrison, Assistant Principal - Alana Roberts
Fred W. Hill Elementary School (4-5), Principal – Tina Colby, Assistant Principal - Lauren Combo

Middle school
Oliver Middle School (6-8), Principal – Jerrod D. Roberts, Assistant Principals - Michelle Guerrieri and Matthew Hennard

High school
Brockport High School (9-12), Principal – Michael Pincelli, Assistant Principals - Orlando Benzan (9th grade and 10th grade M-Z), Michael Bourne (12th grade and BASE Alternative High School) and David Iacchetta (11th grade and 10th grade A-L)

References

External links
Brockport Central School District Website
New York State School Boards Association

School districts in New York (state)
Education in Monroe County, New York